Randall Belford Jackson (born March 6, 1944) is an American former college and professional football player who was an offensive lineman in the National Football League (NFL) for eight years during the 1960s and 1970s.  Jackson played college football for the University of Florida, and thereafter, he played professionally for the Chicago Bears of the NFL.

Early years 

Randy Jackson was born in Lake City, Florida in 1944, and he attended Lake City High School.

College career 

Jackson received an athletic scholarship to attend the University of Florida in Gainesville, Florida, where he was a tackle for coach Ray Graves' Florida Gators football team from 1963 to 1965.  As a senior in 1965, he was a member of the first Gators squad to ever receive an invitation from a "major" bowl, the 1966 Sugar Bowl.  Jackson graduated from Florida with a bachelor's degree in business administration in 1968, and was later inducted into the University of Florida Athletic Hall of Fame as a "Gator Great."

Professional career 

See also 

 Florida Gators football, 1960–69
 List of Chicago Bears players
 List of Florida Gators in the NFL Draft
 List of University of Florida alumni
 List of University of Florida Athletic Hall of Fame members

References

Bibliography 

 Carlson, Norm, University of Florida Football Vault: The History of the Florida Gators, Whitman Publishing, LLC, Atlanta, Georgia (2007).  .
 Golenbock, Peter, Go Gators!  An Oral History of Florida's Pursuit of Gridiron Glory, Legends Publishing, LLC, St. Petersburg, Florida (2002).  .
 Hairston, Jack, Tales from the Gator Swamp: A Collection of the Greatest Gator Stories Ever Told, Sports Publishing, LLC, Champaign, Illinois (2002).  .
 McCarthy, Kevin M.,  Fightin' Gators: A History of University of Florida Football, Arcadia Publishing, Mount Pleasant, South Carolina (2000).  .
 McEwen, Tom, The Gators: A Story of Florida Football, The Strode Publishers, Huntsville, Alabama (1974).  .
 Nash, Noel, ed., The Gainesville Sun Presents The Greatest Moments in Florida Gators Football, Sports Publishing, Inc., Champaign, Illinois (1998).  .

1944 births
Living people
People from Lake City, Florida
Players of American football from Florida
American football offensive tackles
Florida Gators football players
Chicago Bears players